Esquimalt—Saanich—Sooke is a federal electoral district in Greater Victoria, on the southern tip of Vancouver Island in British Columbia, Canada.

It was created by the 2012 federal electoral boundaries redistribution, came into effect in 2013, and first contested in the general election on Monday October 19th, 2015. Esquimalt—Saanich—Sooke encompasses portions of the south Island previously included in the electoral districts of Esquimalt—Juan de Fuca and Saanich—Gulf Islands. The riding contains the Township of Esquimalt, the City of Colwood, the District of Metchosin, View Royal, Sooke, as well as the North Quadra, Swan Lake and Cloverdale neighbourhoods in Saanich East and all of Saanich West. The population of the district was 113,004 in 2011.

The district was originally planned to be named "Saanich—Esquimalt—Juan de Fuca".

Demographics

According to the Canada 2016 Census

Languages: 86.2% English, 2.4% French, 1.5% Punjabi, 1.1% German, 1.0% Cantonese, 1.0% Tagalog
Religions (2011): 43.0% Christian (13.7% Catholic, 7.9% Anglican, 5.6% United Church, 2.6% Baptist, 1.3% Lutheran, 1.3% Pentecostal, 1.2% Presbyterian, 9.4% Other), 1.4% Sikh, 52.6% No religion 
Median income (2015): $37,275 
Average income (2015): $45,081

Members of Parliament

This riding has elected the following members of the House of Commons of Canada:

Election results

Notes

References

British Columbia federal electoral districts
British Columbia federal electoral districts on Vancouver Island
Saanich, British Columbia